Nacer Hammami (born December 28, 1980) is an Algerian football player who is currently playing for MC El Eulma in the Algerian Ligue Professionnelle 1.

References

External links
 dzfoot.com profile

1980 births
Living people
Algerian Ligue Professionnelle 1 players
MC El Eulma players
Association football defenders
Algerian footballers
21st-century Algerian people